Mount Kaina may refer to:
Kaina Mountain, located in Glacier National Park in the U.S. state of Montana
Mount Kaina (戒那山), former name of Mount Yamato Katsuragi, located in Osaka and Nara Prefectures in Japan